Gaia BH1 (Gaia DR3 4373465352415301632) is a binary system consisting of a G-type main-sequence star and a likely stellar-mass black hole, located about  away from the Solar System in the constellation of Ophiuchus. , it is the nearest known system that astronomers are reasonably confident contains a black hole, followed by Gaia BH2 and A0620-00.

The star and black hole orbit each other with a period of 185.59 days and an eccentricity of 0.45.

Discovery 

Gaia BH1 was discovered in 2022 via astrometric observations with Gaia, and also observed via radial velocity. The discovery team found no astrophysical scenario that could explain the observed motion of the G-type star, other than a black hole. The system differs from "black hole impostors" such as LB-1 and HR 6819 in that the evidence for a black hole does not depend on the mass of the star or the inclination of the orbit, and there is no evidence of mass transfer. The discovery team also found a second system that is a candidate for containing a black hole, which was also reported by another team of astronomers, and was confirmed in 2023 as Gaia BH2.

The black hole was also independently detected by a second team, who found slightly different parameters.

See also 

 GRS 1915+105
 OGLE-2011-BLG-0462
 VFTS 243

References 

Ophiuchus (constellation)
G-type main-sequence stars
Stellar black holes
Astrometric binaries
20220914